Gyrineum pusillum, common name the purple gyron triton,  is a species of predatory sea snail, a marine gastropod mollusk in the family Cymatiidae.

Description
The length of the shell varies between 7 mm and 25 mm.

Distribution
This species occurs in the Red Sea and in the Indian Ocean off Tanzania and Aldabra

References

 Spry, J.F. (1961). The sea shells of Dar es Salaam: Gastropods. Tanganyika Notes and Records 56
 Taylor, J.D. (1973). Provisional list of the mollusca of Aldabra Atoll.
 Vine, P. (1986). Red Sea Invertebrates. Immel Publishing, London. 224 pp
 Beu A. (2010). Catalogue of Tonnoidea

External links
 

Cymatiidae
Gastropods described in 1833